Inna Tumanyan (10 September 1929 —  10 January 2005) was a Soviet-Armenian film director. She directed seven films including When I Will Become a Giant.

References

External links 

1929 births
2005 deaths
Mass media people from Moscow
Armenian film directors
Russian film directors
Soviet film directors
Russian people of Armenian descent
Soviet women film directors
Burials in Troyekurovskoye Cemetery
Gerasimov Institute of Cinematography alumni
Moscow State University alumni